Alan Leigh Sawyer (January 1, 1928 – June 30, 2012) was an American professional basketball player for the Washington Capitols of the National Basketball Association (NBA).  He played college basketball for the UCLA Bruins from 1945 to 1950. He missed the end of the 1948–49 season after an appendectomy.  Sawyer helped lead the 1949–50 team to their first Pacific Coast Conference (PCC) championship. He was named to the first team of the All-Southern Division PCC team in 1949, and voted to the second team in 1950. He was selected in the third round of the 1950 NBA Draft by the Capitols.

After the Capitols were disbanded mid-season in 1951, its players were allocated to other teams, and Sawyer was drafted by the Tri-Cities Blackhawks. However, he decided to return to the University of California, Los Angeles, to complete his degree.
 
Sawyer later became a math teacher and coached basketball at Orange Coast College in Costa Mesa, California.

NBA career statistics

Regular season

References

1928 births
2012 deaths
Basketball players from Long Beach, California
Forwards (basketball)
Junior college men's basketball coaches in the United States
Sportspeople from Long Beach, California
UCLA Bruins men's basketball players
Washington Capitols draft picks
Washington Capitols players
American men's basketball players